Araranguá Lighthouse is an active lighthouse in Araranguá, Brazil on the Atlantic Ocean.

History
It was built in 1953 on a rocky bluff named Morros dos Conventos nearby the beach. The lighthouse is a cylindrical concrete tower with four buttresses surmounted by a metal skeletal tower with the lantern on the top. The tower is white painted with a black horizontal band. The lighthouse is managed by Brazilian Navy and is identified by the country code number BR-3960.

See also
List of lighthouses in Brazil

References

External links
  Centro de Sinalização Náutica Almirante Moraes Rego

Lighthouses in Brazil